Ndongala or N'Dongala is a surname. Notable people with the surname include:

Dieumerci Ndongala (born 1991), Congolese footballer 
Eugène Diomi Ndongala (born 1960), Congolese politician 
Aristote N'Dongala (born 1994), Congolese footballer
Daudet N'Dongala (born 1994), French professional footballer